Maxim Podoprigora (born April 18, 1978 in Kiev, Ukraine) is an Olympic breaststroke swimmer from Austria. He has swum for Austria at three Olympics (2000, 2004 and 2008) swimming the 200 breaststroke at all three and the 100 breaststroke in 2004.

He swims for Vienna Swim Club (ASV Wien) and studied at the  University of Vienna.  He serves in the Austrian Army.

His primary event is the 200 breaststroke. In 2001, he garnered a silver medal at the World Championships in the event, in an Austrian Record of 2:11.09. In 2000, he won a bronze medal at the European Championships in the 200 breaststroke. At the European Short Course Championships, he has won medals in the event in: 1998 (bronze), 2001 (gold), and 2002 (silver).

He is Jewish.

References

1978 births
Living people
Austrian Jews
Austrian people of Ukrainian-Jewish descent
Jewish swimmers
Austrian male breaststroke swimmers
Swimmers at the 2000 Summer Olympics
Swimmers at the 2004 Summer Olympics
Swimmers at the 2008 Summer Olympics
Olympic swimmers of Austria
Ukrainian emigrants to Austria
Ukrainian Jews
Swimmers from Vienna
University of Vienna alumni
Sportspeople from Kyiv
World Aquatics Championships medalists in swimming
European Aquatics Championships medalists in swimming